Engine Company 16-Truck Company 3 is a fire station and a historic structure located in the Downtown area of Washington, D.C.  It was listed on both the District of Columbia Inventory of Historic Sites and on the National Register of Historic Places in 2011.  The three-story brick building was designed by Albert L. Harris and built in 1932.

References

Fire stations completed in 1932
Fire stations on the National Register of Historic Places in Washington, D.C.
Federal architecture in Washington, D.C.